Kohnab or Kahnab, sometimes written Konab, may refer to:
 Kohnab, Lali, Khuzestan Province
 Kohnab, Kohgiluyeh and Boyer-Ahmad
 Konab, Markazi
 Kahnab, Zanjan
 Kohnab-e Bala (disambiguation)
 Kohnab-e Pain